A. pretrei may refer to:

 Amazona pretrei, the Red-spectacled Amazon, a species of parrot found in Argentina and  Brazil
 Amphisbaena pretrei, Duméril & Bibron, 1839, a worm lizard species in the genus Amphisbaena found in Brazil

See also
 Pretrei (disambiguation)